The 2019 Seattle Sounders FC season was the club's eleventh season in Major League Soccer, the United States' top-tier of professional soccer. The 2019 season was Brian Schmetzer's third full MLS season as head coach of the Sounders. Seattle-based Zulily became the official jersey sponsor of the Sounders in the 2019 season.

Sounders FC won their second MLS Cup title at the end of the season, playing in front of a franchise-record 69,274 fans at CenturyLink Field.

Background

Recap

In January 2019, the Sounders announced that their USL-affiliated team, Seattle Sounders FC 2, that had moved to Tacoma, Washington would be re-branded as the Tacoma Defiance. In addition, the club announced that Zulily would replace Xbox as the jersey sponsor after signing a multi-year deal.

Long-time midfielder Osvaldo Alonso, who had served as captain and been with the club since its inaugural MLS season, was released into free agency and signed with Minnesota United FC in January 2019. Defender Chad Marshall, who had joined in 2014, announced his retirement from professional soccer on May 22, leaving mid-way through the season.

On August 2, defender Román Torres was suspended for ten matches after testing positive for a performance-enhancing substance by the league.

The Sounders clinched a spot in the 2020 CONCACAF Champions League by virtue of having the 4th best record in the regular season and making it to the Western Conference Finals in the Playoffs; the three other teams in the Conference Finals had also clinched berths in the Champions League or were ineligible (in the case of Toronto FC).

Current roster

Competitions

Preseason

Mobile Mini Sun Cup

Other

Friendlies

Major League Soccer

League tables

Western Conference

Overall

Results

MLS Cup Playoffs

U.S. Open Cup

Statistics

Appearances and goals

Numbers after plus-sign(+) denote appearances as a substitute.

[TAC] – Defiance player

Top scorers
{| class="wikitable" style="font-size: 95%; text-align: center;"
|-
!width=30|Rank
!width=30|Position
!width=30|Number
!width=175|Name
!width=75|
!width=75|
!width=75|
!width=75|Total
|-
|rowspan="1"|1
|FW
|10
|align=left| Raúl Ruidíaz
|11
|4
|0
|15
|-
|rowspan="1"|2
|FW
|13
|align=left| Jordan Morris
|10
|3
|0
|13
|-
|rowspan="1"|3
|MF
|10
|align=left| Nicolás Lodeiro
|7
|2
|0
|9
|-
|rowspan="2"|4
|MF
|7
|align=left| Cristian Roldan
|6
|0
|0
|6
|-
|DF
|18
|align=left| Kelvin Leerdam
|5
|1
|0
|6
|-
|rowspan="1"|6
|MF
|19
|align=left| Harry Shipp
|5
|0
|0
|5
|-
|rowspan="1"|7
|MF
|8
|align=left| Víctor Rodríguez
|2
|1
|1
|4
|-
|rowspan="1"|8
|FW
|17
|align=left| Will Bruin
|2
|0
|0
|2
|-
|rowspan="3"|11
|MF
|4
|align=left| Gustav Svensson
|0
|1
|0
|1
|-
|DF
|29
|align=left| Román Torres
|1
|0
|0
|1
|-
|MF
|70
|align=left| Handwalla Bwana
|1
|0
|0
|1
|-

Top assists
{| class="wikitable" style="font-size: 95%; text-align: center;"
|-
!width=30|Rank
!width=30|Position
!width=30|Number
!width=175|Name
!width=75|
!width=75|
!width=75|
!width=75|Total
|-
|rowspan="1"|1
|MF
|10
|align=left| Nicolás Lodeiro
|12
|4
|0
|16
|-
|rowspan="2"|3
|DF
|11
|align=left| Brad Smith
|6
|1
|0
|7
|-
|FW
|13
|align=left| Jordan Morris
|6
|1
|0
|7
|-
|rowspan="1"|4
|FW
|9
|align=left| Raúl Ruidíaz
|3
|3
|0
|6
|-
|rowspan="1"|5
|MF
|7
|align=left| Cristian Roldan
|4
|1
|0
|5
|-
|rowspan="2"|6
|MF
|4
|align=left| Gustav Svensson
|1
|3
|0
|4
|-
|DF
|33
|align=left| Joevin Jones
|2
|2
|0
|4
|-
|rowspan="2"|8
|MF
|8
|align=left| Víctor Rodríguez
|3
|0
|0
|3
|-
|MF
|19
|align=left| Harry Shipp
|3
|0
|0
|3
|-
|rowspan="1"|10
|MF
|18
|align=left| Kelvin Leerdam
|2
|0
|0
|2
|-
|rowspan="5"|11
|MF
|16
|align=left| Alex Roldan
|1
|0
|0
|1
|-
|FW
|17
|align=left| Will Bruin
|1
|0
|0
|1
|-
|DF
|20
|align=left| Kim Kee-hee
|1
|0
|0
|1
|-
|MF
|21
|align=left| Jordy Delem
|1
|0
|0
|1
|-
|MF
|70
|align=left| Handwalla Bwana
|1
|0
|0
|1
|-

Disciplinary record
{| class="wikitable" style="text-align:center;"
|-
| rowspan="2" !width=15|
| rowspan="2" !width=15|
| rowspan="2" !width=120|Player
| colspan="3"|MLS
| colspan="3"|MLS Playoffs
| colspan="3"|U.S. Open Cup
| colspan="3"|Total
|-
!width=34; background:#fe9;|
!width=34; background:#fe9;|
!width=34; background:#ff8888;|
!width=34; background:#fe9;|
!width=34; background:#fe9;|
!width=34; background:#ff8888;|
!width=34; background:#fe9;|
!width=34; background:#fe9;|
!width=34; background:#ff8888;|
!width=34; background:#fe9;|
!width=34; background:#fe9;|
!width=34; background:#ff8888;|
|-
|-
|| 3 || |DF ||align=left| Jonathan Campbell || |1|| |0|| |0|| |0|| |0|| |0|| |0|| |0|| |0|| |1|| |0|| |0
|-
|-
|| 4 || |MF ||align=left| Gustav Svensson || |1|| |0|| |0|| |0|| |0|| |0|| |0|| |0|| |0|| |1|| |0|| |0
|-
|-
|| 5 || |DF ||align=left| Nouhou Tolo || |5|| |0|| |0|| |1|| |0|| |0|| |0|| |0|| |0|| |6|| |0|| |0
|-
|-
|| 7 || |MF ||align=left| Cristian Roldan || |4|| |0|| |1 || |0|| |0|| |0|| |0|| |0|| |0|| |4|| |0|| |1 
|-
|-
|| 8 || |MF ||align=left| Víctor Rodríguez || |1|| |0|| |0|| |0|| |0|| |0|| |0|| |0|| |0|| |1|| |0|| |0
|-
|-
|| 9 || |FW ||align=left| Raúl Ruidíaz || |0|| |0|| |0|| |1|| |0|| |0|| |0|| |0|| |0|| |1|| |0|| |0
|-
|-
|| 10 || |MF ||align=left| Nicolás Lodeiro || |7|| |0|| |0|| |1|| |0|| |0|| |0|| |0|| |0|||8|| |0|| |0
|-
|-
|| 12 || |DF ||align=left| Saad Abdul-Salaam || |2|| |0|| |0|| |0|| |0|| |0|| |0|| |0|| |0|| |2|| |0|| |0
|-
|-
|| 13 || |FW ||align=left| Jordan Morris || |2|| |0|| |0|| |0|| |0|| |0|| |0|| |0|| |0|| |2|| |0|| |0
|-
|-
|| 15 || |MF ||align=left| Emanuel Cecchini || |1|| |0|| |0|| |0|| |0|| |0|| |0|| |0|| |0|| |1|| |0|| |0
|-
|-
|| 16 || |MF ||align=left| Alex Roldan || |0|| |0|| |0|| |0|| |0|| |0|| |1|| |0|| |0|| |1|| |0|| |0
|-
|-
|| 17 || |FW ||align=left| Will Bruin || |1|| |0|| |0|| |0|| |0|| |0|| |1|| |0|| |0|| |2|| |0|| |0
|-
|-
|| 18 || |DF ||align=left| Kelvin Leerdam || |7|| |0|| |1|| |1|| |0|| |0|| |0|| |0|| |0|| |8|| |0|| |1
|-
|-
|| 19 || |MF ||align=left| Harry Shipp || |1|| |0|| |0|| |0|| |0|| |0|| |0|| |0|| |0|||1|| |0|| |0
|-
|-
|| 20 || |DF ||align=left| Kim Kee-hee || |6|| |0|| |0|| |0|| |0|| |0|| |0|| |0|| |0|| |6|| |0|| |0
|-
|-
|| 21 || |MF ||align=left| Jordy Delem || |4|| |0|| |0|| |0|| |0|| |0|| |0|| |0|| |0|||4|| |0|| |0
|-
|-
|| 24 || |GK ||align=left| Stefan Frei || |1|| |0|| |0|| |0|| |0|| |0|| |0|| |0|| |0|||1|| |0|| |0
|-
|-
|| 25 || |DF ||align=left| Xavier Arreaga || |1|| |2|| |0|| |0|| |0|| |0|| |0|| |0|| |0|| |1|| |2|| |0 
|-
|-
|| 29 || |DF ||align=left| Román Torres || |2|| |0|| |0|| |0|| |0|| |0|| |0|| |0|| |0|| |2|| |0|| |0
|-
|-
|| 22 || |DF ||align=left| Joevin Jones || |2|| |0|| |0|| |0|| |0|| |0|| |0|| |0|| |0|| |2|| |0|| |0
|-
|-
|| 70 || |MF ||align=left| Handwalla Bwana || |1|| |0|| |0|| |0|| |0|| |0|| |0|| |0|| |0|||1|| |0|| |0
|-
|-
|| 75 || |MF ||align=left| Danny Leyva || |1|| |0|| |0|| |0|| |0|| |0|| |0|| |0|| |0|||1|| |0|| |0
|-
|-
!colspan=3|Total !!51!!2!!2!!4!!0!!0!!2!!0!!0!!58!!2!!2

Honors and awards

MLS Team of the Week

Bold indicates Audi Player Index Spotlight

Italics indicates MLS Player of the Week

MLS Goal of the Week

MLS Comeback Player of the Year
 Jordan Morris

MLS Cup MVP
 Víctor Rodríguez

MLS Sporting Executive of the Year
 Garth Lagerwey

Transfers

For transfers in, dates listed are when Sounders FC officially signed the players to the roster. Transactions where only the rights to the players are acquired are not listed. For transfers out, dates listed are when Sounders FC officially removed the players from its roster, not when they signed with another club. If a player later signed with another club, his new club will be noted, but the date listed here remains the one when he was officially removed from Sounders FC roster.

In

Draft picks

Draft picks are not automatically signed to the team roster. Only those who are signed to a contract will be listed as transfers in. Only trades involving draft picks and executed after the start of 2019 MLS SuperDraft will be listed in the notes.

Out

Notes
A.  Players who are under contract with Tacoma Defiance.

References

Seattle Sounders FC seasons
Seattle Sounders
Seattle
Seattle
MLS Cup champion seasons